Muhammad Youssef (born 5 March 1960) is a Pakistani boxer. He competed in the men's super heavyweight event at the 1984 Summer Olympics.

References

1960 births
Living people
Super-heavyweight boxers
Pakistani male boxers
Olympic boxers of Pakistan
Boxers at the 1984 Summer Olympics
Place of birth missing (living people)
Asian Games medalists in boxing
Boxers at the 1986 Asian Games
Asian Games bronze medalists for Pakistan
Medalists at the 1986 Asian Games
20th-century Pakistani people